RAVEN Respecting Aboriginal Values & Environmental Needs is a charitable organization that provides financial resources to assist Aboriginal nations within Canada in lawfully forcing industrial development to be reconciled with their traditional ways of life, and in a manner that addresses climate change and other ecological sustainability challenges.

Mission
RAVEN's mission is to assist Aboriginal peoples in Canada in protecting or restoring their traditional lands and resources and addressing critical environmental challenges such as climate change by strategically enforcing their Constitutional rights through the courts in response to unsustainable settlement or industrial exploitation supported by the State.

Funding
RAVEN (Respecting Aboriginal Values and Environmental Needs) is a registered Canadian non-profit organization with charitable tax status. RAVEN's registration number is 85484 0147 RR0001. The organization is also a tax exempt charitable organization in the United States with 501(c)(3) status, and EIN A-98-0628334.

Friends of RAVEN Foundation was registered as a charity (BN 71875 2512 RR0001) in December 2019.  It supports RAVEN (Respecting Aboriginal Values & Environmental Needs) & access to justice for Indigenous Peoples.

Activities and structure
RAVEN raises legal defence funds to assist Indigenous Peoples in Canada who enforce their rights and title through the courts to protect their traditional territories. The legal actions of RAVEN’s First Nation partners have the potential to set precedents for future cases, advance legal rights and title of Indigenous Peoples in Canada, and influence environmental impacts by mitigating climate change, maintaining biological diversity, and improving or maintaining access to clean water and secure food supplies.  

Since 2014, RAVEN has raised more than CAD $7,200,000 for First Nations partners. The legal actions funded resulted in the quashing of the approval of the Enbridge Northern Gateway pipeline; protection of 83% of the Peel Watershed in the Yukon; halting of mining developments at Teztan Biny (Fish Lake), and T’ak Tl’ah Bin (Morrison Lake); and the cancellation of the Petronas Pacific Northwest LNG project at the mouth of the Skeena River.  

RAVEN raises legal defence funds for Nations that are defending their territories from the destructive impacts of resource extraction:  

 From the oil sands to the sea, challenging the fossil fuel corridor: Beaver Lake Cree Nation taking on Alberta and Canada; the Wet’suwet’en legal challenge to stop the Coastal GasLink pipeline through their territory (Central Coast, BC); Heiltsuk Nation’s civil action against US-based Kirby Corporation, British Columbia and Canada over a catastrophic diesel spill in the Great Bear Sea (north central BC Coast);  
 For rivers and rights in Treaty territory: Site C dam campaign with West Moberly First Nations (Treaty 8, BC);  
 Mining justice: Gitxaala Nation’s challenge to the BC Mineral Tenure Act to protect Banks Island (North Coast, BC); Neskantaga Nation’s legal challenge to inadequate environmental review in the Ring of Fire mining region (Ontario); Tsilhqot’in Nation’s civil action against Taseko Mines Ltd and BC.

RAVEN is the only non-profit organization in Canada with a mandate to raise legal defence funds to help Indigenous Peoples in Canada defend their Aboriginal rights and title (as guaranteed in section 35 of the Canadian Constitution), and the integrity of their traditional lands and cultures.

A sample of the organizations RAVEN has worked with includes Sierra Club BC, Amnesty International, Indigenous Climate Action, Canadian Parks and Wilderness Society, Skeena Wild Conservation Trust, Force of Nature, Greenpeace, Yellowstone to Yukon (Y2Y) Conservation Initiative, LeadNow, The Leap, Dogwood Initiative, and 1% for the Planet.  

RAVEN's board of directors includes Jeffrey Nicholls (President), Ron Lameman, Cliff Atleo, Rachelle Loos, Susan Gee, Clara Bradley and Robert Hallam (Treasurer). RAVEN's legal advisory panel comprises John Borrows, Karen Drake, Brenda Gunn, Alan Hanna and Brock Roe.

Friends of RAVEN Foundation 
Friends of RAVEN Foundation was established to support the work of RAVEN (Respecting Aboriginal Values and Environmental Needs).  Friends of RAVEN will hold donations, endowments, and legacy gifts, for the purpose of disbursing to RAVEN to facilitate its purposes, which are to assist Indigenous Peoples in protecting and restoring the natural environment for all peoples in Canada by providing legal services, including litigation, aimed at enforcing compliance with the existing laws of Canada; and developing and delivering education programs to advance knowledge and understanding of available legal rights and remedies.  

Through an endowment from Harmony Foundation of Canada, Friends of RAVEN is supporting the RAVEN-Harmony Foundation Environmental Essay Prize for Young Scholars.  

Initiatives that RAVEN provides  ongoing support to  include an Intervenor Fund to allow Indigenous Nations to participate nimbly in legal interventions.  There are also plans to develop funds to support Title Actions, which require extensive financial resources.  Friends of RAVEN expects to ultimately support the core/operating side of RAVEN, so that all funds raised in campaigns for Nations can go to cover the legal costs.

Campaigns

Beaver Lake Cree Nation vs. the tar sands

The Beaver Lake Cree, a small, impoverished band of 900 people in eastern Alberta, are suing the Canadian federal and Alberta provincial governments to protect the land. They claim that Alberta's tar sands developments are obliterating their traditional hunting and fishing lands in Alberta. The animals, fish, plants and medicine that sustain the Beaver Lake Cree are being destroyed.

In Canada, the rights of Indigenous people are constitutionally protected. Led by Chief Al Lameman, the Beaver Lake Cree Nation is asserting a treaty right to hunt and fish throughout lands where tar sands activity is destroying the forest. This court action seeks an injunction against new developments. The Beaver Lake Cree’s Statement of Claim cites more than 17,000 infringements on their treaty rights and in the course of doing so names every major oil company in the world.

Investment in the bituminous sands in northern Alberta – the world's last great oil field – totals approximately $200 billion. No assessment of the cumulative environmental or cultural damage has been done. It has been argued that this project – unhindered – will destroy a large part of the great boreal forest of North America, will escalate global warming, and will destroy an indigenous way of life. The Alberta government continues to approve projects, such that production of dirty oil will increase from the current 1.3 million barrels per day (210,000 m3/d) to 3 million barrels per day (480,000 m3/d) by 2015.

Already vast expanses of the boreal forest have been cut down – causing significant damage to the environment and to the earth's well-being. The forest is home to a long list of animals, from black bears and caribou to marten and moose. Chief Al Lameman says they can no longer find caribou herds where caribou were abundant just 12 years ago. Moose are also being displaced in large numbers and simply cannot be found. There is evidence the herds are also not self-sustaining – there is not a new calf population to replace the older population of moose.

As the forest is eroded to make way for open mines and in-situ mines, the ‘great lung’ of North America with its rich carbon-storing peat and soil, is disappearing. In its place, rapid growth of carbon emissions threatens to increase the earth's temperature. Meanwhile, oil sands extraction pollutes the earth with its tailings ponds, pollutes the air with its emissions, and pollutes the water using two to four barrels of water to produce just one barrel of bitumen and creating vast lakes of chemicals that leach into local watersheds.

Beaver Lake Cree history
The Beaver Lake Cree is a small Indian community located in eastern Alberta, north-east of Edmonton and just outside Lac La Biche. It currently has approximately 900 members. In the early 19th century, the Hudson's Bay Company built a trading post at Lac La Biche, and the locals hunted, fished and trapped fur to sell to the HBC agents. In the 1870s the Canadian government was involved in a gradual process of treaty making aimed at addressing Aboriginal title and opening up the lands for settlement. By the middle of the decade, food supplies for the plains Cree were running low with a rapid decline in buffalo, and geographical survey crews were running into tensions with the local inhabitants. In July 1875, Cree warriors stopped a telegraph crew at the fork of the Saskatchewan River. In response the Canadian government sent Treaty Commissioner Alexander Morris to meet with Cree, Chipewyan and Salteaux leaders beginning on August 15, 1876.

Discussions lasted for several days and included many pipe ceremonies. The pipe ceremonies were viewed by the Cree people as a mark of the solemnity of the occasion. In the presence of the pipe only the truth could be told and it was understood that promises made as part of such ceremonies would be kept. For their part, the Commissioners invoked the name of the Queen, and made the treaty promises in her name. Beaver Lake's immediate ancestors met with Commissioner Morris at Fort Pitt in September, 1876. There Morris gave this speech:

… I see the Queen's Councillors taking the Indian by the hand saying we are brothers, we will lift you up, we will teach you, if you will learn, the cunning of the white man. All along the road I see Indians gathering, I see gardens growing and houses building; I see them receiving money from the Queen's Commissioners to purchase clothing for their children, at the same time I see them enjoying their hunting and fishing as before, I see them retaining their old mode of living with the Queen's gift in addition.

Chief Pay-ay-sis signed Treaty 6. He and the other chiefs surrendered approximately 195,000 square kilometres of land . In return for their land, they were promised that they would be able to hunt and fish to make a living from the land as they had always done, and they were promised that each band member would be paid $5.00 per year.

The promise to pay $5.00 per year to each Cree person has been faithfully kept every year.

The important text of Treaty 6 is:
The Plain and Wood Cree Tribes of Indians, and all other the Indians inhabiting the district hereinafter described and defined, do hereby cede, release, surrender and yield up to the Government of the Dominion of Canada, for Her Majesty the Queen and Her successors forever, all their rights, titles and privileges, whatsoever, to the lands included within the following limits…
Her Majesty further agrees with Her said Indians that they, the said Indians, shall have right to pursue their avocations of hunting and fishing throughout the tract surrendered as hereinbefore described, subject to such regulations as may from time to time be made by Her Government of Her Dominion of Canada, and saving and excepting such tracts as may from time to time be required or taken up for settlement, mining, lumbering or other purposes by Her said Government of the Dominion of Canada, or by any of the subjects thereof duly authorized therefor by the said Government.

There is a tension built into the treaty between the Crown's right to take up land, and the enduring right of the Indians to hunt and fish. In the 19th century the amount of unspoiled land available for hunting and fishing was so huge that no amount of settlement seemed to affect the wildlife populations. For over one hundred years under the treaty there was always a meaningful opportunity to hunt and fish, so conflict between the Crown's rights and the Indian's rights did not arise.

But in the last two decades, the tar sands developments have encroached on such huge amounts of land that there is now a conflict between the viability of the treaty rights and the Crown's right to continue to alienate land.

The law in this situation has recently been expressed by the Supreme Court of Canada. The Crown cannot take up so much land as to compromise the meaningful right to hunt. If game becomes so scarce that the Indians would have to travel too far, and expend too much effort to make the hunting worthwhile, then the treaty right is no longer meaningful. If that decrease in the abundance of fish and wildlife is caused by Crown actions, then the Crown actions can be declared unconstitutional.

Potential impact of tar sands on the Beaver Lake Cree 
The Athabasca oil sands deposit represents the second largest known deposit of oil in the world - after Saudi Arabia. There are estimated to be more than a trillion barrels of oil embedded in the sands, with an estimated  considered to be recoverable. That amount is expected to double or triple in the next few years, based on recent massive private investment in these projects.

The environmental liabilities that result from the various steps in oil sands extraction and refining process include: (i) Destruction of the boreal forest eco-system; (ii) Damage to the Athabasca watershed; (iii) Heavy consumption of natural gas; (iv) Creation of toxic tailings ponds; and (v) Increased release of greenhouse gases

i. Destruction of the boreal forest eco-systemAll of the oil sands leases slated for development are located in the boreal forest.  The boreal forest is particularly valuable for its ability to store large amounts of carbon in its bogs, peat, soil, and trees.  The destruction of boreal forest reduces the earth's capacity to store carbon and releases greenhouse gases into the atmosphere as it is destroyed.  The currently proposed oil sands projects, if all were to be activated, would directly remove an area of boreal forest eco-system twice the size of Ireland.  Destruction of the forest eliminates the habitat for birds, fish, and mammals, including caribou, bear, deer, moose, wolves, coyotes, lynx, wolverine, beaver, fisher, marten, muskrat, and squirrels. Reclamation is not a credible solution.ii. Damage to the Athabasca watershedTwo to four and a half barrels of water are required to produce a barrel of oil from the tar sands. Water is used to create the slurry of bitumen and oil that is heated and processed.  Water is also disposed of through Steam Assisted Gravity Drainage method of extraction where steam is pumped into the ground to cause bitumen to flow into a lower pipe for removal. For every barrel of oil produced approximately one barrel of water is contaminated in the process and deposited into a tailings pond.

At present, large water allocations from the Athabasca River are assigned to industrial use. A recent Alberta government report concluded that: “Over the long term, the Athabasca River may not have sufficient flows to meet the needs of all the planned mining operations and maintain adequate instream flows.” This is one of Canada's largest rivers.

Water impacts threaten fish, wildlife, downstream communities, and transportation in the McKenzie delta. The toxicity of the tailings ponds also represent threats to local aquifers and to the quality of water in the Athabasca River due to the danger of seepage or a sudden and large catastrophic failure of a pond's enclosure. Already there have been reports of unusually high incidence of certain kinds of cancer in the populations living downstream.iii. Heavy consumption of natural gasNatural gas is burned to heat the bitumen in the tar sands in order to extract the liquid oil. The energy equivalent of one barrel of oil in natural gas is needed to produce three barrels of synthetic crude. Producing a barrel of oil from the oil sands requires approximately one thousand cubic feet of natural gas.

Natural gas is a fossil fuel, and when it burns to create heat it adds carbon dioxide to the atmosphere. But the additional concern is that natural gas releases less carbon dioxide per unit of energy produced than oil does - especially heavy oil, or synthetic crude. So, a relatively clean non-renewable fossil fuel is being burned to create a very dirty fossil fuel.iv. Creation of toxic tailings pondsThe “tailings” from the bitumen retrieval and refining processes include sand, silt and clay mixed with leftover hydrocarbons and other toxic substances. Tailings are being created at a rate of 2,000 or so litres per barrel of bitumen, resulting in about 1.8 billion litres of tailings every day. In May 2008, tailings ponds covered approximately 130 km2 of Alberta.

Tailings ponds include substances of concern for the water quality that discharge to surface waters:
•	salts
•	elevated sodium, chloride, sulphate
•	elevated total dissolved solids, pH, conductivity and alkalinity
•	lower calcium and magnesium (soft water)
•	variable levels of trace metals, including boron, arsenic and strontium
•	elevated ammonia
•	naphthenic acids, phenols, hydrocarbons
•	and polycyclic aromatic hydrocarbons
•	other acute and chronic toxicants

In many cases, huge ponds sit with very short berms separating them from the Athabasca River. The Athabasca is the source river of the McKenzie watershed – downstream are communities that depend on the river for their water and livelihood. It is the principal source of food fish for Aboriginal communities.

In April 2008, considerable press coverage arose when 500 ducks landed on the Syncrude tailings pond and died. Syncrude did not report the incident and it only became public because of an anonymous tip. Provincial regulations require the use of scarecrows and soundmakers to attempt to divert the birds from the ponds, but these were not functioning at the time. A member of the Sierra Club of Alberta, Jeh Custer, started a private prosecution against Syncrude in 2008. A private prosecution for an environmental office is a legal proceeding where an individual attempts to enforce an environmental statute, in circumstances where the Crown prosecutors fail to do so. Such private prosecutions almost always fail. But they serve to embarrass governments who are not doing their job. On February 10 both Canada and Alberta commenced formal court proceedings against Syncrude for the same offences. If convicted, Syncrude could face a maximum $300,000 fine.v. The release of greenhouse gasesThere are three main sources of greenhouse gas increases resulting from tar sands extractions:
1.	Release of carbon from the living boreal forest as it is destroyed.
2.	Burning of natural gas, itself a fossil fuel, in the refining process
3.	The carbon released from the bitumen itself.
Because of the huge amount of greenhouse gas release in the process of creating synthetic crude oil, Alberta produces three times more greenhouse gas emissions per capita than the Canadian average and six times the West European average.

The earth's atmosphere currently contains about 459 ppm CO2 equivalent greenhouse gases. At that elevated level we are now into the danger zone. It is well understood that as the concentrations of CO2 approach 550 ppm there is near certainty that the earth will warm 2 degrees, and will probably warm 3 degrees, an amount of warming that would be fully catastrophic. Over the next 30 years as the tar sands are exploited under current plans, this one source alone will add about 65 ppm of carbon dioxide to earth's atmosphere. Even if nobody else on earth created carbon dioxide over the next 30 years, exploitation of the tar sands will push the level of CO2 in our atmosphere to 525 ppm. This one source will single-handedly cancel out all worldwide efforts to control climate change. All the good effects of conservation, conversion to solar, wind, tidal, geothermal and other expensive unconventional energy sources will be for nothing, because this one industrial project will continue pushing up the atmospheric concentrations of carbon dioxide and equivalent greenhouse gases. All the planning and sacrifice by the rest of the world will be cancelled out by this one industry.

And, in the course of exploiting the tar sands and destroying the boreal forest, the treaty rights of the Beaver Lake Cree Nation will be rendered meaningless.

Toxic Fuels Campaign
In February 2009, the Co-operative Financial Services announced it was backing the Beaver Lake Cree legal action. In the bank's press release, Paul Monaghan, Head of Social Goals and Sustainability at CFS said: “We already know that commercialisation of tar sands risks massive environmental damage. If the Beaver Lake Cree Nation are successful in their ground-breaking legal challenge and other indigenous groups follow, oil companies could also be looking at massive investment damages.” CFS launched its Toxic Fuels campaign, designed to "combat the shocking global trend of extracting oil from unconventional sources, such as tar sands and shale oil. Such exploitation threatens global efforts to avoid dangerous levels of climate change and risks local ecological disaster."  The Toxic Fuels campaign has a direct link to RAVEN in order to provide financial support for the lengthy and costly legal action. CFS has donated more than £100,000 towards the Beaver Lake Cree's lawsuit.

Tsilhqot'in fight to save Teztan Biny
Taseko Mines Ltd. is proposing to develop the Prosperity Mine, a massive open pit gold and copper mine, deep within the traditional territory of the Tsilhqot'in Nation. The proposed Prosperity Mine is located in south central British Columbia, approximately 125 km southwest of Williams Lake, on an alpine plateau in the Chilcotin, beneath the rugged glaciated peaks of the Coast Range. The Prosperity Mine, if developed, would be situated in a site of exceptional natural splendor, close to the Nemaiah Valley, Ts'yl-os Provincial Park, and the ?Elegesi Qayus Wild Horse Preserve.

A statement prepared by the Tsilhqot'in National Government and placed on the RAVEN website says: the proposed mine’s two kilometer-wide open pit, tailings pond, waste rock piles, roads, and transmission lines would destroy an entire sub-alpine ecosystem, and most importantly Teztan Biny, a lake sacred to the Tsilhqot'in Nation, and known to others as Fish Lake. Teztan Biny is a beautiful mountain lake which our ancestors have used and managed since time immemorial. Teztan Biny supports a vibrant population (some 85,000) of genetically unique Rainbow Trout that provide a critical food source for the Tsilhqot'in people and local wildlife; including blue-listed species of concern such as Grizzly Bears.

For generations the Tsilhqot'in have gone to Teztan Biny to fish, to set fish traps and nets, hunt and trap, gather medicines, engage in spiritual practices, reconnect with the land, honor their elders, share stories, and foster unity. It is more than a lake to the Tsilhqot'in – it is an integral part of Tsilhqot'in culture, and vital to their cultural continuity and survival. Many non-Aboriginal local residents and tourists also enjoy Teztan Biny for a wide variety of recreational activities. The Tsilhqot'in Nation is neither against development nor against the responsible use of natural resources. In fact, as the traditional keepers of the land for thousands of years, we have successfully balanced the need for sustainable harvesting with long-term preservation. To the Tsilhqot'in people, the destruction of Teztan Biny is an unacceptable use of land and water, incompatible with modern principles of sustainability, and an ill-conceived and shortsighted attempt to inject an industrial project into the heart of our pristine watershed.

It is here that wild salmon begin their long journey to the Pacific Ocean via the Chilko, the Chilcotin and ultimately, the Fraser River. Teztan Biny is a vital part of the watershed that supports one of the largest and most productive salmon fisheries in North America. Toxic effluents that seep from the mine tailings and waste rock facilities at the proposed mine could negatively impact BC's already threatened Fraser salmon fishery.

The Prosperity Mine was rejected in 2010 by the federal government, based on a scathing independent federal review that found the mine would have irreversible, devastating impacts to local fish and fish habitat and endangered grizzly populations, to Tsilhqot’in cultural activities and heritage, and to the proven and asserted Aboriginal rights and title of the Tsilhqot’in people.

In 2011, Taseko Mines resubmitted a revised plan, rebranded as the New Prosperity Mine, to a second federal review panel.  The New Prosperity mine was rejected by the federal government again in 2014 based on environmental and cultural impacts.  The independent federal panel of experts concluded in 2013 that New Prosperity would have significant and immitigable impacts on water quality, fisheries and Tŝilhqot'in cultural heritage, rights and traditional practices. The panel’s report also noted that Taseko Mines was unable to even meet “proof of concept” for its unprecedented, unproven, entire-lake recirculation proposal and that Teztan Biny would be contaminated over time, despite mitigation efforts.

Based on the review panel’s findings, the federal Cabinet rejected the New Prosperity proposal in 2014.  Taseko Mines launched legal proceedings, to challenge the second rejection.  This rejection was subsequently affirmed by various levels of the judiciary, including a Judicial Review, the Federal Court of Appeal, and the Supreme Court of Canada, which declined in 2020 to hear any further appeals from Taseko Mines.

Taseko was at the same time pushing “exploratory drilling” in the Teztan Biny area, for which they had provincial permits issued to them by the out-going government led by Christy Clark in 2017. Even though the federal government had rejected New Prosperity mine – a decision confirmed by the Supreme Court – mineral exploration permits such as Taseko holds are issued by the province of British Columbia, and do not require an actual mine proposal. Those permits are not affected by the Supreme Court decision.

In 2019, with Taseko preparing for exploratory drilling, the Tŝilhqot'in filed a civil action against Taseko, British Columbia and certain British Columbia government officials for infringement of proven Aboriginal rights at Teztan Biny (Fish Lake) and the surrounding area, called Nabaŝ. This comprehensive legal action will be heard in 2022; in the meantime Taseko has been prohibited from drilling under an injunction issued by the B.C. Supreme Court.

RAVEN continues to support the Tŝilhqot'in through this ongoing legal action whose goal is to protect the Teztan Biny/Nabaŝ area once and for all from any further encroachment by mining.

See also
 Environmental issues in Canada

References

External links
 
 Beaver Lake Cree Nation
 Vimeo - Blue Gold: The Tsilhqot'in Fight for Teztan Biny
 Vimeo - Truth, Trials and Tar Sands
 Co-operative Financial Service's Toxic Fuels Campaign
 Woodward & Company
 It's Getting Hot In Here - Indigenous voices challenge Royal Bank tar sands policies advocacy site
 Times Colonist article on Blue Gold: The Tsilhqot'in Fight for Teztan Biny
 Rafe Mair: A Priceless BC Asset Threatened by Mining

Environmental organizations based in British Columbia
Organizations based in Victoria, British Columbia
First Nations organizations in British Columbia
Charities based in Canada
Indigenous peoples and the environment
Indigenous rights in Canada